Ludwig Manfred Lommel (1891–1962) was a German stage and film actor. He was the father of the actress Ruth Lommel and actor Ulli Lommel. His youngest son Manuel Lommel is a cinematographer.

Selected filmography
 Paul and Pauline (1936)
 Hilde and the Volkswagen (1936)
 Die Christel von der Post (1956)

References

Bibliography
 Hull, David Stewart. Film in the Third Reich: a study of the German cinema, 1933-1945. University of California Press, 1969.

External links

1891 births
1962 deaths
People from Jawor
People from the Province of Silesia
German male film actors
German male stage actors